Brojnići is a village in the municipality of Pale-Prača, Bosnia and Herzegovina.

Demographics 
According to the 2013 census, its population was 27.

References

Populated places in Pale-Prača